Bob Alligood (born December 5, 1932) is an American former politician in the state of Florida.

Alligood was born in Georgia and came to Florida in 1950. He served in the Florida House of Representatives from 1965 to 1967, as a Democrat, representing Liberty County.

References

Living people
1932 births
Democratic Party members of the Florida House of Representatives
People from Mitchell County, Georgia
People from Liberty County, Florida